Antonio Rosa Ribeiro (born 8 October 1992), commonly known as Toni or Tony, is a Brazilian footballer who currently plays as a midfielder for Emirati Club side Hatta.

Career statistics

Club

Notes

References

1992 births
Living people
Brazilian footballers
Brazilian expatriate footballers
Association football midfielders
Clube Atlético Mineiro players
Democrata Futebol Clube players
Operário Ferroviário Esporte Clube players
Clube Náutico Marcílio Dias players
Clube Atlético Metropolitano players
Tombense Futebol Clube players
FC Cascavel players
Brusque Futebol Clube players
Paraná Clube players
Atlético Petróleos de Luanda players
Hatta Club players
Campeonato Brasileiro Série D players
Girabola players
Campeonato Brasileiro Série B players
UAE First Division League players
Brazilian expatriate sportspeople in Angola
Brazilian expatriate sportspeople in the United Arab Emirates
Expatriate footballers in the United Arab Emirates
Expatriate footballers in Angola